Stradbroke railway station was a station located in Stradbroke, Suffolk, England. Stradbroke Station opened on 29 September 1908, and closed on 28 July 1952, 44 years after it had opened for passenger traffic.

References

External links
 Transport in Stradbroke

Disused railway stations in Suffolk
Former Mid-Suffolk Light Railway stations
Railway stations in Great Britain opened in 1908
Railway stations in Great Britain closed in 1952
1908 establishments in England
Stradbroke